The Omani passport is issued to citizens of Oman for international travel. Omani passports are issued by the Royal Omani Police or at an Omani Embassy overseas. The biometric passport was first issued in 2014. It consists of 48 pages and is valid for up to 10 years.

Passport types 

Passport types are specified under article No. 3 of the Omani passport law, issued by Royal Decree No. 69/97. The specified types are as follows:
 Ordinary passport (red cover)
 Diplomatic passport (black cover)
 Special passport (burgundy cover)
 Service passport (blue cover)
 The laissez-passer.

Appearance
Omani passports' cover is red and have inscriptions in golden letters indicating the official name of the country at the top and the word "passport" at the bottom both in Arabic and English divided by the coat of arms. The biometric passport symbol, alerting to the presence of a RFID chip inside the document, is at the very bottom of the cover page.

Identity information page
The Omani passport identity page is in two languages - Arabic and English - and includes the following data:
 Passport holder's photo 4x6cm 
 Type ("P" for Passport)
 Country (OMN for Oman)
 Passport Number
 Holder's Surname
 Holder's Given Names
 Nationality
 Date of Birth
 Date of Issue
 Date of Expiry
 ID Number
 Place of Birth
 Issuing Authority
 Passport Holder's Signature

Bilateral visa exemption treaties 

In addition to the unilateral visa waivers that holders of Omani passports enjoy; Oman has signed several bilateral visa exemption treaties for the benefit of diplomatic, service, and special passports:
 An agreement with France for the holders of diplomatic, service and special passports.
 An agreement with China for the holders of diplomatic, service and special passports.
 An agreement with Switzerland for the holders of diplomatic, service and special passports.
 An agreement with the United Kingdom for the holders of diplomatic and special passports.
 An agreement with Lithuania for the holders of diplomatic, service and special passports.
 An agreement with Belarus for the holders of diplomatic, service and special passports.
 An agreement with Italy for the holders of diplomatic, service and special passports.
 An agreement with Portugal for the holders of diplomatic, service and special passports.
 An agreement with Malta for the holders of diplomatic, service and special passports.
 An agreement with Korea for the holders of diplomatic, service and special passports.

Visa requirements

In June 2019, Omani citizens had visa-free or visa on arrival access to 83 countries and territories, ranking the Omani passport 52nd in the world according to the Passport index

See also
 Visa policy of Oman
Visa requirements for Omani citizens

References

Oman
Government of Oman